A contact microphone, also known as a piezo microphone, is a form of microphone that senses audio vibrations through contact with solid objects. Unlike normal air microphones, contact microphones are almost completely insensitive to air vibrations but transduce only structure-borne sound. Often used as acoustic leakage probes, they also enjoy wide usage by noise music artists experimenting with sound. Contact microphones can be used to amplify sound from acoustic musical instruments, to sense drum hits, for triggering electronic samples, and to record sound in challenging environments, such as underwater under high pressure.

Contact microphones based on piezo materials are passive and high-impedance, and they sound tinny without a matching preamp.

The most commonly available contact microphone element is made of a thin piezoelectric ceramic round glued to a thin brass or alloy metal disc. This center disc is positively charged while the brass disc is negatively charged. The voltage can be measured across those parts and then amplified to produce sound.

See also
 Throat microphone

References 

Microphones